Castera Bazile (7 October 1923 – 27 February 1966) was a Haitian painter. Born in Jacmel, Bazile painted several murals in the Holy Trinity Cathedral in Port-au-Prince. He won the grand prize at the Caribbean International Competition in 1955.

Bazile died of tuberculosis in 1966 in Port-au-Prince, age 42.

References

1923 births
1966 deaths
People from Jacmel
20th-century Haitian painters
20th-century Haitian male artists
Haitian male painters
20th-century deaths from tuberculosis
Tuberculosis deaths in Haiti